Le Glaizil is a commune in the Hautes-Alpes department in southeastern France. It is famous for hosting the ruins of the castle of the Duke of Lesdiguières, Constable of France in the 17th century.

Population

Gallery

See also
Communes of the Hautes-Alpes department

References

Communes of Hautes-Alpes